Dibamus novaeguineae, is a legless lizard found in the Philippines, Indonesia, and Malaysia.

References

Dibamus
Reptiles of the Philippines
Reptiles of Indonesia
Reptiles of Malaysia
Reptiles described in 1839
Taxa named by André Marie Constant Duméril
Taxa named by Gabriel Bibron
Snakes of New Guinea